Konoike is a Japanese surname. Notable people with the surname include:

, Japanese artist
, Japanese politician

Japanese-language surnames